The 2022 Bryant Bulldogs football team represented Bryant University as first-year members of the Big South Conference in the 2022 NCAA Division I FCS football season. The Bulldogs, led by fourth-year head coach Chris Merritt, played their home games at Beirne Stadium in Smithfield, Rhode Island.

Schedule

References

Bryant
Bryant Bulldogs football seasons
Bryant Bulldogs football